Historian Richard Doherty wrote that the division was created as an ad hoc measure "to achieve stabilisation" followed the Battle of Kasserine Pass on February 19. Brigadier Nelson Russell was given command. Doherty stated that the division comprised the 38th (Irish) Brigade, the 1st Parachute Brigade, one French infantry battalion, and artillery support. H.F. Joslen, compiler of the official history detailing British orders of battle, concurs that the Irish Brigade formed part of the division, but does not list the paratroopers as part of it. He recorded the division included the 1st Infantry Brigade (Guards). The latter joined the division on 27 February, while the Irish Brigade joined on 16 February, likely the formation date of the division. The division was disbanded on 16 March. Richard Doherty wrote that "Russell never did find out why the formation was actually called Y Division".

Order of battle

See also

 List of British divisions in World War II
 British Army Order of Battle (September 1939)

Notes

Footnotes

Citations

References

 
 

Infantry divisions of the British Army in World War II
Army Reserve (United Kingdom)
Military units and formations established in 1943
Military units and formations disestablished in 1943